Redding is a city in southwest Ringgold County, Iowa, United States. The population was 63 at the time of the 2020 census.

Geography
Redding is located at  (40.605076, -94.388469).

Demographics

2010 census
As of the census of 2010, there were 82 people, 37 households, and 21 families living in the city. The racial makeup of the city was 100.0% White.

There were 37 households, of which 21.6% had children under the age of 18 living with them, 48.6% were married couples living together, 2.7% had a female householder with no husband present, 5.4% had a male householder with no wife present, and 43.2% were non-families. 35.1% of all households were made up of individuals, and 29.7% had someone living alone who was 65 years of age or older. The average household size was 2.22 and the average family size was 2.95.

The median age in the city was 51.5 years. 24.4% of residents were under the age of 18; 3.7% were between the ages of 18 and 24; 14.7% were from 25 to 44; 36.6% were from 45 to 64; and 20.7% were 65 years of age or older. The gender makeup of the city was 50.0% male and 50.0% female.

2000 census
As of the census of 2000, there were 78 people, 35 households, and 24 families living in the city. The racial makeup of the city was 100.00% White.

There were 35 households, out of which 20.0% had children under the age of 18 living with them, 60.0% were married couples living together, 2.9% had a female householder with no husband present, and 31.4% were non-families. 25.7% of all households were made up of individuals, and 14.3% had someone living alone who was 65 years of age or older. The average household size was 2.23 and the average family size was 2.71.

In the city, the population was spread out, with 17.9% under the age of 18, 3.8% from 18 to 24, 24.4% from 25 to 44, 34.6% from 45 to 64, and 19.2% who were 65 years of age or older. The median age was 47 years. For every 100 females, there were 110.8 males. For every 100 females age 18 and over, there were 113.3 males.

The median income for a household in the city was $13,750, and the median income for a family was $36,250. Males had a median income of $24,375 versus $23,750 for females. The per capita income for the city was $10,144. There were 22.2% of families and 30.2% of the population living below the poverty line, including 15.8% of under eighteens and 40.0% of those over 64.

Education
Mount Ayr Community School District operates public schools serving the community.

References

Cities in Ringgold County, Iowa
Cities in Iowa